is a Japanese manga artist. She is best known for creating the manga series Pandora Hearts and The Case Study of Vanitas.

Biography
Jun Mochizuki was born on December 22 in Kanagawa Prefecture. After graduating from high school, Mochizuki applied for an art school, but was ultimately not accepted into the school. Following this, she continued drawing and eventually submitted her work to Square Enix. Her first work was a one-shot titled Pandora Hearts. Following the one-shot's publication, she launched Crimson-Shell. It was serialized in Monthly GFantasy from September 2005 to February 2006.

Following Crimson-Shells completion, she launched Pandora Hearts (different from the one-shot) in Monthly GFantasy on May 18, 2006. The series concluded in Monthly GFantasy on March 18, 2015. The series did well, and received an anime television series adaptation. Following Pandora Hearts conclusion, she launched The Case Study of Vanitas in Monthly Gangan Joker on December 22, 2015. Like her previous series, The Case Study of Vanitas also received an anime television series adaptation, which premiered in July 2021.

Influences
Mochizuki has cited Fullmetal Alchemists author Hiromu Arakawa as her main source for inspiration. Arakawa was the reason Mochizuki chose to submit to Square Enix instead of other manga publishers.

Works
 Crimson-Shell (2005–2006, serialized in Monthly GFantasy, 1 volume)
 Pandora Hearts (2006–2015, serialized in Monthly GFantasy, 24 volumes)
 The Case Study of Vanitas (2015–present, serialized in Monthly Gangan Joker, 10 volumes)

References

External links
  
 
 

Female comics writers
Japanese female comics artists
Living people
Manga artists from Kanagawa Prefecture
Women manga artists
Year of birth missing (living people)